Ho Wai Loon  (born 20 August 1993) is a Singaporean professional footballer who plays as a defender for Singapore Premier League club Balestier Khalsa and the Singapore national team.

Club career

Balestier Khalsa
Ho started his footballing career in 2011, playing for Balestier Khalsa. Ho was released in 2013 but signed for Balestier again in 2014 for the 2014 S.League season.

In 2015, Ho tore his anterior cruciate ligament (ACL) which took him out of play for more than a year.

Warriors
He then signed for Warriors FC ahead of the 2017 S.League season. That was where he gained his first national team call up.

Home United
In January 2019, Ho joined fellow S.League club Home United.

Balestier Khalsa 
In March 2020, Ho fractured his right ankle during training.

On 12 June 2021, Wai Loon returned to Balestier Khalsa on loan from Lion City Sailors till the end of the 2021 season. He joined the Tigers on loan for the rest of the season to regain his match fitness after fracturing his ankle during training.

International career

Youth
Ho played at the 2015 Southeast Asian Games football tournament, although he was sent off for his second yellow card offence in Singapore's must win game against Indonesia U23.

Senior
Ho was first called up to the senior side in 2017, as a standby player for the friendly against Afghanistan and the 2019 Asian Cup Qualifiers against Bahrain on 23 and 28 March 2017 respectively.

After being included in the national set-up for a year, Ho finally won his first cap for Singapore in a friendly against Fiji on 11 September 2018, coming on as a substitute in the 62nd minute. Ho made his first start and second appearance for the national team against Cambodia on 16 October. However, he scored an own-goal and was eventually substituted early in the 46th minute.

Ho was called up in September 2022 by head coach Takayuki Nishigaya for international friendlies against Vietnam and India on 21 and 24 September.

Others

Singapore Selection Squad
He was selected as part of the Singapore Selection squad for The Sultan of Selangor's Cup to be held on 6 May 2017.

Career statistics

Club
As at 10 October 2021

International Statistics

International caps

U19 International caps

Statistics accurate as of match played 12 October 2018

Honours
Balestier Khalsa
 Singapore Cup: 2014
 League Cup: 2013

References

External links
 

1993 births
Living people
Singaporean footballers
Singapore international footballers
Balestier Khalsa FC players
Warriors FC players
Home United FC players
Singapore Premier League players
Singaporean sportspeople of Chinese descent
Association football defenders
Lion City Sailors FC players